Wojciech Sekuła (born 1982) is a Polish slalom canoeist who competed at the international level from 1999 to 2006 in the C2 class together with Jarosław Miczek.

Sekuła won two bronze medals in the C2 team event at the ICF Canoe Slalom World Championships (2002, 2003).

References

Living people
Polish male canoeists
1982 births
Place of birth missing (living people)
Medalists at the ICF Canoe Slalom World Championships